Trigg County Public Schools is a school district serving Trigg County, Kentucky.  Communities served by the school district include Cadiz, Canton, Cerulean, Wallonia and surrounding areas.

Schools

Elementary school
Trigg County Primary School
Serves PreK-2nd Grades

Intermediate school
Trigg County Intermediate School
Serves 3rd-5th Grades

Middle school
Trigg County Middle School
Serves 6th-8th Grades

High school
Trigg County High School
Serves 9th-12th Grades

Athletics
The sports teams at Trigg County High School are known as the Wildcats.  Trigg County High first had a sports team in 1937–38 with boys' basketball.  The first football team took the field in 1938.

Trigg County has won 16 KHSAA state championships, all in Class 1A sports.

1971 – Football (A)
1972 – Football (A)
1972 – Girls Track (A)
1974 – Girls Track (A) 
1978 – Boys Track (A)
1981 – Boys Track (A)
1982 – Boys Track (A)
1983 – Boys Track (A)
1983 – Girls Track (A) 
1982 – Girls Cross Country (A)
1986 – Boys Cross Country (A) 
1991 – Girls Cross Country (A) 
1995 – Boys Track (A)
2013 – Archery
2014 – Archery
2015 – Archery

External links
Trigg County Schools

Education in Trigg County, Kentucky
School districts in Kentucky